Relax Darling (French: Relaxe-toi chérie) is a 1964 French-Italian comedy film directed by Jean Boyer and starring Fernandel, Sandra Milo and Jean-Pierre Marielle. Based on the play Le Complexe de Philémon by Jean Bernard-Luc, it was the final film of the veteran director Jean Boyer.

The film's sets were designed by the art director Robert Giordani. It was shot at the Billancourt Studios in Paris.

Synopsis
A couple have been happily married for twelve years, until the wife discovers psychoanalysis. She becomes convinced that her husband's normal exterior conceals endless secrets and enlists her friends to try and find out the truth.

Cast
 Fernandel as François Faustin
 Sandra Milo as Helene Faustin
 Jean-Pierre Marielle as David Kouglov
 Jean Lefebvre as Blaise
 Maurice Chevit as Hubert
 Hélène Dieudonné as Antonia
 Jacqueline Jefford as Mademoiselle Pelusso
 Hella Petri as Olga
 Catherine Clarence as La dactylo brune
 Liliane Gaudet as Christiane
 Nicole Gueden as La dactylo blonde
 Kajio Pawlowski as Van Druck, l'industriel hollandais
 Jean-Paul Zola as Le président de la société industrielle
 Pascale Roberts as Cécile
 Yvonne Clech as Lucienne

References

Bibliography 
 Quinlan, David. Quinlan's Illustrated Directory of Film Stars. Batsford, 1996.

External links 
 

1964 films
French comedy films
Italian comedy films
1964 comedy films
1960s French-language films
Films directed by Jean Boyer
Films shot at Billancourt Studios
French films based on plays
Italian films based on plays
1960s French films
1960s Italian films